Kotohiki may refer to:

Kotohiki Beach, a beach in Kyoto Prefecture, Japan
Kotohiki Park, a park in Kagawa Prefecture, Japan
Kayoko Kotohiki, a character in the novel Battle Royale